The 2013–14 season is Coventry City's 94th season in The Football League and their second consecutive season in League One. In addition to League One, the Sky Blues also entered the Football League Cup and FA Cup in the first rounds. They also entered the Football League Trophy in the second round after being awarded a bye for the first round.

Review and events

Monthly events
This is a list of the significant events to occur at the club during the 2013–14 season, presented in chronological order. This list does not include transfers or match results.

June:
 17 – Coventry City were drawn to play Leyton Orient away in the first round of the Football League Cup.
 19 – Coventry City's 2013–14 season fixtures in League One were revealed.
 28 – Coventry City defender Aaron Phillips pens a new one-year deal with the club, commencing on 1 July 2013.
 28 – Callum Wilson and Billy Daniels have penned new deals at the club. Wilson has penned a one-year deal and Daniels a two-year deal.
 28 – Leon Lobjoit, Ben Maund, Louis Garner and Lewis Rankin all sign one-year professional deals at the club.

July:
 3 – Coventry City have agreed to groundshare with Northampton Town at the Sixfields Stadium for the next three years.
 4 – Coventry City were awarded a bye for the first round of the 2013–14 Football League Trophy.
 8 – The Football League has approved the application from Otium Entertainment Group to see Coventry City groundshare with Northampton Town to play at Sixfields Stadium for an initial period of three seasons.
 10 – Coventry City's second pre-season friendly and first on the tour of the Netherlands against Go Ahead Eagles has been cancelled due to the high risk of football hooliganism.
 15 – Coventry City confirmed a replacement pre-season fixture to replace the cancelled match against Go Ahead Eagles, The Sky Blues would take on German side TSV Wachtendonk.
 16 – Coventry City's home Football League One clash against Sheffield United has been selected to be shown live on Sky Sports on Sunday 13 October 2013.

August:
 2 – Otium Entertainment Group were awarded the Golden Share for the 2013–14 season but club handed ten-point deduction from the Football League.
 15 – Coventry City scooped up the LMA Performance of the Week award for the 5–4 win over Bristol City.

September:
 3 – Cyrus Christie was named London Supporters Club Player of the Month.
 12 – Callum Wilson won the August goal of the month award for his second of two goals in the 4–4 draw with Preston North End on 25 August 2013.
 13 – Jordan Willis signed a new two-year contract, with an option of a further year.
 16 – Jordan Clarke signed a new two-year contract, with an option of a further year.
 18 – Callum Wilson won the August player of the month.
 19 – Coventry City have teamed up with medical charity Grace Research Fund who will adorn Sky Blues shirts for the next three months.
 19 – Coventry City will wear the new 2013/14 home shirt for the first time for the League One clash against Sheffield United on 13 October 2013. The match will also be shown live on Sky Sports.

October:
 4 – Steven Pressley handed a first team squad number to 16-year-old academy player James Maddison.
 16 – Franck Moussa won the September goal of the month award for his long-range effort in the 3–2 loss against Port Vale at Vale Park.
 24 – Callum Wilson won the September player of the month.
 30 – Coventry City's FA Cup first round away tie against AFC Wimbledon was chosen for live television screening on BT Sport. The match will be played on Friday 8 November 2013.
 31 – Callum Wilson signs a new contract to keep him at the club until June 2015 with the option to extend to 2016.

November:
 1 – Callum Wilson was named October's PFA Fan's Player of the Month for League One.
 7 – Coventry City handed a squad number to Academy player Courtney Baker-Richardson ahead of the FA Cup fixture against AFC Wimbledon.
 12 – Conor Thomas signs a new contract to keep him at the club until June 2016.
 12 – Franck Moussa won the October goal of the month award for his delightful chip against Leyton Orient in the 3–1 win on Tuesday, 22 October.
 22 – Ryan Haynes signs a new contract to keep him at the club until June 2017.
 22 – Billy Daniels signs a new contract to keep him at the club until June 2016.
 26 – Coventry City hand squad number to Ivor Lawton ahead of the League One fixture against Rotherham United.

December:
 10 – Coventry City fan appointed as head of the CCFC Stadium Forum which will consult on the new stadium design.
 10 – Coventry City Academy and Alan Higgs Centre reach agreement on a permanent return.
 11 – Chris Maguire won the November goal of the month award for his second free-kick against Milton Keynes Dons in the 3–1 win on Saturday, 30 November.
 11 – John Fleck won the November Player of the Month award.

January:
 1 – Aaron Phillips signs a new contract to keep him at the club until June 2016.

February:
 20 – Franck Moussa won the CCFC January Player of the Month vote with 68% beating Joe Murphy in second with 22% of the vote.
 20 – Franck Moussa won the CCFC January Goal of the Month vote with 75.8% beating Carl Baker in second spot.

Squad details

Players info

Matches

Preseason friendlies

League One

FA Cup

League Cup

Football League Trophy

League One data

League table
A total of 24 teams contest the division: 17 sides remaining in the division from last season, three relegated from the Championship, and four promoted from League Two.

Results summary

Round by round

Scores overview

Season statistics

Appearances and goals

|-
|colspan="14"|Players who left before the season ended:

Goalscorers

Assists

Yellow cards

Red cards

Captains

Penalties awarded

Suspensions served

Monthly & weekly awards

Goal of the month awards

End-of-season awards

International appearances

Overall

 † Club were deducted 10 points before season start.

Transfers

Transfers in

Transfers out

Loans in

Loans out

Trials

References

External links
 Official Site: 2013–14
 BBC Sport – Club Stats
 Soccerbase – Results | Squad Stats | Transfers

Coventry City
Coventry City F.C. seasons